Bhawanipatna is a city and the headquarter of the Kalahandi district, in the Indian state of Odisha. Bhawanipatna has numerous temples dedicated to different deities of the Hindu pantheon. It is named after the presiding deity, Bhawani-Shankar and Patna which means "place" in Odia like "Padaa". Bhawanipatna municipality is the administrative head of the city, which is divided into twenty wards with different sub-areas called pada (pronounced "padaa"). Originally, these padaas were inhabited by people of different communities, but over the last few decades, these padaas have become homogeneous. Bhawanipatna has more than forty padaas.

Geography and climate
Bhawanipatna is located in the center of large mountains and plateaus. It has eastern ghat mountains in its eastern frontier.

Climate
Bhawanipatna has a tropical wet and dry climate, and temperatures remain moderate throughout the year, except from March to June, which can be extremely hot. The temperature in April–May sometimes rises above . The summer months also have dry and hot winds.

Demographics
 India census, Bhawanipatna had a population of 69,045 and 83,756 including its suburbs. The population of children ranging from ages 0–6 is 7,407, which is 10.73% of the total population of Bhawanipatna (M). In Bhawanipatna Municipality, the female sex ratio is 945 against the state average of 979. Moreover, the child sex ratio in Bhawanipatna is around 911 compared to the Orissa state average of 941. The literacy rate of Bhawanipatna city is 85.00% higher than the state average of 72.87%. In Bhawanipatna, male literacy is around 90.95% while the female literacy rate is 78.72%, according to the 2011 census. Out of the total population, 23,705 were engaged in work or business activity. Of this 18,666 were males while 5,039 were females. In the census survey, a worker is defined as a person who engages in business, a job, service, cultivation, or other labour activities. Of a total working population of 23,705, 84.55% were engaged in main work while 15.45% of total workers were engaged in marginal work.

Language and literature
The language spoken by the people of Kalahandi is the Kalahandia and sambalpuri dialect of Oriya, locally known as Kalahandi. Local weekly newspapers such as Arjji and Kalahandi Express publish articles in standard Odia and Kalahandi languages. Other languages include Kui, Bhatri (another dialect of Odia), Parji, and Bhunjia, spoken by approximately 7000 Bhunjia Adivasis.

Politics
Current MLA from Bhawanipatna Assembly Constituency is Pradipta Kumar Naik of BJP, who won the seat in the State Legislative election of 2019. Previous MLA from this seat is Anam Naik from Biju Janata Dal, who won the election in the year 2014. Dusmanta Kumar Naik of INC won the seat in the State election of 2009. Pradip Kumar Naik of BJP won the seat in the State elections of 2004 and also in 2000 and 1995, Ajit Das of JD won this seat in 1990, Bhaktacharan Das of JNP in 1985, and Dayanidhi Naik who won this seat in 1980 as a candidate of INC(I) and as INC candidate in 1977.

Bhawanipatna is part of the Kalahandi constituency, currently held by Basanta Kumar Panda, and before that by Arka Keshari Deo, who was the grandson of Maharaj Pratap Kesari Deo of Kalahandi.

Tourism
 Maa Manikeshwari Mandir and Chatar jatra
There are two Manikeshwari Mandirs located in the Kalahandi district of Odisha, one is in Bhawanipatna and other at Thuamal Rampur. The temple is located in the center of Bhawanipatna. The main deity here is Goddess Manikeshwari. The main devotees are from the fisherman community. During the Dussehra festival, animal sacrifice is offered at this temple which is a festival also known as Chatar jatra where thousands of people gather in the city to get blessings from their beloved goddess. A film is also documented showing the ritual of animal sacrifice before Goddess Manikeshwari.

 Phurlijharan

Evergreen forests around the fall provide ample opportunities to group picnickers.

 Karlapat Wildlife Sanctuary

SH-44 Karlapat Wildlife Sanctuary (Odia: କର୍ଲାପାଟ୍; Hindi: कर्लापाट्) is a wildlife sanctuary located in Kalahandi district and a very popular tourist attraction of Odisha in India. The sanctuary  sanctuary lies within the Eastern Highlands' moist deciduous forests ecoregion; major plant communities include mixed deciduous forests and scrublands. It has also high mineral deposits like bauxite and manganese. The sanctuary is home to many wildlife species like tiger, leopard, gaur, sambar, nilgai, barking deer, mouse deer, and a wide variety of birds and reptiles.

 Jakham

It has a wooden guest house.

 Rabandara

 Sospadar Waterfall
 Gadagada Twin-Waterfall
 Zilla Sangrahalaya

Zilla Sangrahalaya or the District Museum, Bhawanipatna has different artefacts, manuscripts, paintings and many rare items from pre-historic age (Asurgarh coins, Gudahandi paintings etc.) depicting the ancient history of the Kalahandi Region.

 Permunji

Permunji is a nursery situated at the foot of the great mountain, a place for picnics. Elephants are commonly seen near the nursery crossing roads.

 Hello Point

Hello Point is a picnic spot and valley viewpoint at the top of the eastern ghats from which half of the Kalahandi district is visible including Junagarh and Kalampur block. One can receive a signal from all telecom services for mobile, therefore it is named Hello Point.

Media and broadcasting

* Doordarshan Kendra (DD-6)

It was started as Low Power Transmission on 15 February 1987 and it had been upgraded to High Power Transmission on 20 January 1992. This 10 KW capacity Doordarshan Kendra started functioning in 1992 and is one of the few HPT centers in Sambalpur, Cuttack in Odisha. The studio was started on 3 September 2002. It's one of the three Doordarshan Kendras in the state of Odisha, the others being Sambalpur and Bhubaneshwar. Its studio became operational in 2002. In 2004, it started broadcasting agriculture-related programmes sponsored by the Ministry of Agriculture and simultaneously began broadcasting agriculture programmes in different HPT (high power transmission) centres of the KBK region.

Besides this, it is also used to produce programmes to promote tribal heritage, culture, and drama besides entertainment and awareness building programmes for the KBK. It was broadcasting agriculture-related programmes from 6 pm to 6.30 pm on every Tuesday, Wednesday and Friday and local culture and entertainment based programmes from 5.30 pm to 6 pm each Monday and Thursday. During the period from 2005 to 2009, the centre has bagged 10 national awards and five nominee prizes for different programmes produced by it.

* All India Radio (Akashwani Bhawanipatna 103 FM)

All India Radio or Akashwani Bhawanipatna started on 30 December 1993 near Naktiguda, outskirts of the city. It has two transmitters 2x100 KW, MW in Belamal near Pastikudi. Frequency of Transmission is 1206 kHz, 248 MTs. It has two studios. The sanctioned strength of the Radio station in all cadres is 100. No. Of Casual Announcers in the Kendra is 56. The composition of originated programmes targets audience programmes for Rural, Women Children, Youth & Senior Citizens, Light & Classical Music, and Film Music. Broadcasting of programmes is done in Odia, Hindi, and English languages. The broadcasting covers a population of approx. 18,66,000 Lacs from Kalahandi, Nuapada, and nearby districts.
All India Radio, #Bhawanipatna was started on 30 Dec 1993 at Naktiguda, Bhawanipatna i.e., Transmission and Studio and Radio Station at Belamal is a Relay Tower.
Recently FM services have been started at AIR station at a frequency of 103  MHz

Primary service zone, Kalahandi District and Naupada District.
The station has not only popular in its primary zone, rather its audience from the district of Bolangir, Sonepur, Phulbani, Bargarh, Nawrangpur and Rayagara of Orissa and Raigarh districts of Chhattisgarh. Moreover, this station serves the districts coming under the capital KBK scheme of the Govt. of India.

Transmission Strength~BEL HMB 140- 2 x 100 KW
Frequency of Broadcast~1206 kHz and 248 meters.
Mast Height~ 122 Meters

* My Channel (Local Media Group)

Digital Cable TV and WiMax provider.

* Ortel Cable and Broadband Service

Digital Cable TV and Broadband provider.

* EM Digital

Festivals

 Dasra (Dussehra): Dasara or Durga Puja is celebrated by Hindus all over India, but is very popular in Eastern India, including Odisha, West Bengal and Assam. However, goddess Durga is known as Shaki (Energy) and most of the goddess based on tribal and Shaki is inspired from goddess Durga. The major goddesses of Kalahandi, including Manikeswari, Lankeswari, Denteswari, Khameswari, and Bhandargharen are seen as a reflection of goddess Durga and most of the major festivals like Chhatar Jatra, Kkandabasha, Budharaja Jatra, etc. are celebrated during Dussehra. Dusra is significant in all the Sakti Pitha in Kalahandi and is one of the popular festival in the region.
 Kalahandi Utsav "Ghumura": It is hosted in Lal Bahadur Shastri stadium
 Diel or Deepawali: Also popularly known as Diwali is celebrated in Kalahandi. But this is getting popular due to immigrant business community mainly from Marwadi community, however, slowly it has entered the local mainstream.
 Nuakhai: This is typically a local festival prevalent in Western Odisha including Kalahandi. It is inspired by the harvesting of new crops and historically came from tribes. But now everybody irrespective of caste, creed, and religion celebrates it. There are many kinds of Nuakhai according to tribal culture, out of which Dhan (Rice) Nuakhai is most popularly celebrated.
 The Chhatra Yatra of Goddess Manikeswari of Bhawanipatna, a popular ceremony. (October)

Market
  Laxmi Bajar

There are several market areas in the city, the biggest one is Laxmi Bajar or Main Market which is at the core of the city. Most of the garment showrooms, costumes, jewelry, grocery, and fancy shops are found here. Fruits and Vegetables are sold in the inner area of the market mainly near Laxmi Mandir.

  Hatpada

Hatpada or Weekly Market is situated near Gandhi Pramod Udyaan (park) is a bi-weekly market that takes place on Tuesday and Saturday where traders from different areas come to sell their goods including vegetables, grocery items, masala & spices, metal products (like utensils etc.), animal and their products like milk products, meat, fishes, etc.

 Mach bazaar

It is located near Ghodaghat bridge where different types of fish and prawns are sold.

 Naktiguda Haat
It is a small Bajar located on NH-26 mainly known for Grocery and Vegetable items.

Sports
 Lal Bahadur Sashtri Stadium is the biggest stadium in Odisha according to the total field area. It is present near the Bhawani Talkies, Old cinema hall. The stadium has held various matches including the Ranji Trophy and the Kalahandi Cup. It is maintained by Kalahandi District Athletic Association. Various sports and athletic training are conducted including Cricket, football, Karate, etc. There are also several tennis courts in the stadium.
 Indoor Stadium (Badminton court) is present near the LBS Stadium.
 The Reserve Police Stadium is the home ground of the Odisha Police.
 The Govt. Autonomous College Field is one of the largest field present as compared to all others in Bhawanipatana.
 D.I.E.T. Field is one of the biggest grounds available in the city used for club cricket, volleyball and football games.

Entertainment
Talkies/Cinema Halls

 Bhawani Talkies was the oldest cinema hall in the city, near L.B.S. Stadium with UFO technology. (Now Closed).
 Satyam Cinema is the biggest cinema hall in the city with UFO technology and Dolby Digital sound.
 New Star Cineplex is the largest multiplex of southwestern Odisha (KBK-South Odisha) with four screens (#3D technology). It is situated near OMFED plant, SH-16 Raipur road, Bhangabari, Bhawanipatna.
Bhagirathi Mall, Second Mall & Multiplex in Bhawanipatna. Multiplex-4 Screen 3D, shopping Mall is situated near Satsang Bihar, NH-26 Junagarh Road, Bhawanipatna.

Parks and Ecological Gardens

 Bhagirathi Park- Present near Shirdi Sai Mandir on SH-44 is a tourist attraction.
 Gandhi Pramod Udyaan- Situated near Statue Square.
 Ecological Park- One of the oldest park present on the outskirt of the city on NH-26.

Education

Technical/Professional institutions
 College of Agriculture, Bhawanipatna
 Government College of Engineering, Kalahandi Bhawanipatna
 Government Polytechnic College Bhawanipatna
 College of Teacher Education, Bhawanipatna

University
Kalahandi University

General degree colleges
 Binayak Residential college, Bhawanipatna
 Government Women's College Bhawanipatna
 Jayaprakash Sandhya Mahavidyalaya, Bhawanipatna
 Pragati Degree College, Bhawanipatna
 Saraswati Degree College, Bhawanipatna
 Sastriji Science College, Bhawanipatna

Schools
 Kendriya Vidyalaya Bhawanipatna
 Hi-Tech Public School Bhwanipatna
 Citizens' Model English Medium Academy, Bhawanipatna
 B.M. High School
 Municipal Govt.High School
 Delhi Public Kids & Primary School, Bhawanipatna
 Vimala Convent School
 Manikeshwari High School
 Saraswati Sishu Vidya Mandir
 Satya Sai Vidya Mandir
 Shastriji model school.(English Medium)
 Shastriji Siksha Niketan. (Odia Medium)

Computer Institutions
 NICE - National Institute of Computer Education.

Health care
There is a medical college and several hospitals including nursing homes in the city which provide good health care services in the city.
There are many ambulance services.
Recently the state government announced a government medical college in Kalahandi. In response 40 acres of land has been handed over to the State Health Department for infrastructure, behind Bhawanipatna Ring Road (Proposed). It is adjacent to SH-16 (Proposed NH).

 Kalahandi Medical College & Hospital, Bhangabari, Bhawanipatna

The state government signed with Vedanta Group to build a medical college and 500-bed hospital at Bhangabari near Bhawanipatna. Recently a MoU has been signed by the state government and Vedanta Group and land acquisition is complete.

 Sardar Rajas Medical College, Hospital & Research Centre (SRMCH)

It was established in 2009 with support from WODC and Government of Odisha for conducting Under-graduate Medical Courses.It is a self-financing medical institution with 100 seats. Its now abandoned and case is currently going on by the medical students against Sylvian Trust at Odisha High Court.

 District Headquarter Hospital

District Headquarter Hospital is the main backbone for the health services in the city and whole district. It has many wards for different kind of patients, there's also a Radio Therapy and Regional Diagnostic centre in the hospital. There is also a blood bank in the hospital campus. Currently a new 6-storey hospital building is under construction.

 Maa Manikeswari Multispeciality Hospital

Earlier known as Life Worth Hospital, it was established in 2004 at Bhawanipatna located near Ghodaghat Chowk (SH-16). It was a branch of Life Worth Super Specialty Hospital present in Raipur. Later it was renamed as Maa Manikeswari Multispeciality Hospital at Bhawanipatna is having all the necessary facilities required during emergency.

 Police Hospital
Situated in Armed Reserve police campus near College Chowk, Bhawanipatna.

Nursing Homes
 Balaji Nursing Home
Near Balaji Mandir
Pardeshi Para
Bhawanipatna

 Surakhya Nursing Home
Near Red Cross Kalyan Mandap
Bhawanipatna

 Jagannath Netralaya Eye Hospital
Near Balaji Mandir
Pardeshi Para
Bhawanipatna

Transport

Air
Utkela Airstrip (VEUK) is present near the city which is scheduled to be operational with daily flights to state capital Bhubaneshwar and Raipur in the coming month of September by private air service provider Air Odisha under UDAN scheme by Ministry of Civil Aviation, Govt. of India. Another one, Lanjigarh Airstrip is private airstrip conducting VIP and chartered planes. Biju Patnaik International Airport in the state capital, Bhubaneswar is 427 km away by road and 631 km by rail.

Rail

Bhawanipatna railway station was inaugurated on 12 August 2012. It is situated on Lanjigarh-Junagarh rail line. Currently there are 3 trains (1 express and 2 passengers) running from Bhawanipatna to Bhubanneshwar, Raipur and Sambalpur. Kesinga Railway station is connected by many major cities in India, like Delhi, Mumbai, Chennai, Surat etc.

Road
Highways connecting Bhawanipatna to various cities :
NH-26 - Bargarh - Bolangir - Bhawanipatna - Nabarangpur - Koraput - Vizianagram - Natavalsa
SH-16 - Bhawanipatna - Borda - Khariar - Raipur
SH-6 - Bhawanipatna - Chatiguda - Ambodala - Muniguda
SH-44 - Bhawanipatna - Gunupur - Thuamul Rampur - Kashipur - Tikri

Bhawanipatna Bus Stand is one of the biggest bus stands in Odisha present on NH-26. Both Private and Govt. buses are available from here. Bhawanipatna is one of the divisions of Odisha State Road Transport Corporation (O.S.R.T.C.) that runs Govt. Buses from Bhawanipatna to Bhubaneshwar, Vishakhapatnam, Sambalpur, Berhampur, Cuttack, Jeypore. Private Buses (A/C Sleeper Coaches) provide transportation facilities to different cities in Odisha and Raipur, Durg etc. in Chhattisgarh. Newly added taxi facility and auto facility including Biju Gaon Gadi throughout Bhawanipatna and villages nearer to it, is adding an advantage to the transport facility.

Notable personalities
 Rendo Majhi: A freedom fighter in Odisha, who started the Kondha revolution against the British in 1853.
 Sujeet Kumar (politician): Rajya Sabha Member, policy maker.
 Bhubaneswar Behera: Engineer, academic, administrator and author.
 Ram Chandra Patra, IAS (retd.): (1919-2013) Bureaucrat, social worker, and administrator acknowledged for his simplicity and administration, and for taking initiative in the Indravati project. He was the first IAS from Kalahandi.
 Prafulla Ratha: Awarded a natyarashmi for his contribution to Oriya drama.
 Kishan Patnaik: Socialist leader. He was born in 1930 into a lower-middle-class family in Kalahandi. Mr Patnaik worked in the youth wing of Samajwadi Yuvjan Sabha and soon rose to become its National president. He was elected to Lok Sabha from Sambalpur at the age of 32 and was one of handful members who turned the Lok Sabha into a real forum to discuss matters of national importance. He was perhaps the first person to bring the issue of starvation death in Kalahandi to the Indian parliament. Mr. Patnaik never lost sight of this fundamental plight of rural India, and securing the right to livelihood for the people on the margin therefore always remained central to his politics and to his vision of development.

Power and transmission
There is a 132/33 kV Grid Station near OMFED diary on SH-16. Power to this grid comes directly from Therubali Grid.
Power transmission and maintenance are done by Grid Corporation of Odisha.

There is also a sub-station in Naktiguda, Bhawanipatna. It is maintained by Western Electricity Supply Company of Odisha

References

External links
 Official website of Kalahandi
 Map of Kalahandi

Cities and towns in Kalahandi district